Aristarchos Fountoukidis (13 February 1942 – 7 July 2007) was a Greek football defender.

Honours
PAOK
Alpha Ethniki: 1975–76
Greek Cup: 1971–72, 1973–74

References

1942 births
2007 deaths
Greek footballers
Super League Greece players
PAOK FC players
Association football defenders
PAOK FC managers
Greek football managers
People from Kilkis (regional unit)
Footballers from Central Macedonia